The Finnish Chess Championship is the national championship in chess in Finland.

Winners

Women's winners

References

External links
 (2006 crosstable)
Finnish Championship July 2008 Finland FIDE Chess Tournament report

Chess national championships
Chess in Finland
Chess